Pterois sphex, the Hawaiian turkeyfish or Hawaiian lionfish is a species of ray-finned fish with venomous spines belonging to the family Scorpaenidae, the scorpionfishes and lionfishes. It is found in the eastern Central Pacific, specifically in marine waters off of Hawaii. It is found in seaward reefs and lagoons at depths from 3 – 122 m.

Taxonomy
Pterois sphex was first formally described in 1903 by the American ichthyologists David Starr Jordan and Barton Warren Evermann with the type locality given as Honolulu on Oahu in Hawaii. The specific name sphex is Greek for “wasp”, thought to be an allusion to the sting delivered by the venomous spines of this species.

Description
Pterois sphex has 13 spines and 11 or 12 soft rays in its dorsal fin while the anal fin has 3 spines and between 6 and 8 soft rays. There are between 6 and 8 very long, unbranched fin rays in the pectoral fins which extend beyond the membrane. The spines of the dorsal fin are very long, some are as long as the body is deep. There are coronal spines and most of the head spines multiply as the fish grows. In larger individuals the lachrymal and suborbital bones have a dense covering of spines. The overall color is brownish pink and white with irregular bright white and brown vertical barring on the flanks. In young fish there are supraorbital tentacles banded with black but these disappear in older fish.

Distribution and habitat
Pterois sphex is found in the eastern central Pacific where it is endemic to the Hawaiian Islands.

Biology
Pterois sphex spends the day hiding underneath ledges and in caves, emerging at night to feed on smaller fishes and crustaceans. They use their fins to shift the sand or mud on the seabed to reveal any diurnal prey resting in the substrate. They are solitary fishes which only gather for mating, although they have been known to hunt cooperatively too. Despite being solitary they are not thought to defend a home range from other Hawaiian lionfishes.

References

sphex
Fish of Hawaii
Taxa named by David Starr Jordan
Taxa named by Barton Warren Evermann
Fish described in 1903